Phan Đình Vũ Hải (born 6 June 1994) is a Vietnamese footballer who plays as a goalkeeper for V.League 1 club Hải Phòng

References 

1994 births
Living people
Vietnamese footballers
People from Hà Tĩnh province
Association football goalkeepers
V.League 1 players
Haiphong FC players
Song Lam Nghe An FC players
Than Quang Ninh FC players